EF-hand domain (C-terminal) containing 2 is a protein that in humans is encoded by the EFHC2 gene.

Gene 

EFHC2 is located on the negative strand (sense strand) of the X chromosome at p11.3. EFHC2 is one of a few, select number of genes with in vitro evidence suggesting it escapes X inactivation. EFHC2 spans 195,796 base pairs and is neighbored by NDP, the gene encoding for Norrie disease protein. Preliminary evidence based on genome wide association studies have linked a SNP in the intron between exons 13 and 14 of EFHC2 with harm avoidance.

The mRNA transcript encoding the EFHC2 protein is 3,269 base pairs. The first ninety base pairs compose the five prime untranslated region and the last 1913 base pairs compose the three prime untranslated region.

Protein 

The EFHC2 gene encodes a 749-amino acid protein which contains three DM10 domains and three calcium-binding EF-hand motifs.

The isoelectric point of EFHC2 is estimated to be 7.13 in humans. Relative to other proteins expressed in humans, EFHC2 has fewer alanine residues and a greater number of tyrosine residues and is predicted to reside in the cytoplasm.

Tissue distribution 
EFHC2 is widely expressed in the central nervous system as well as peripheral tissues.

Clinical significance 

A related protein, EFHC1 is encoded by a gene on chromosome 6. It has been suggested that both proteins are involved in the development of epilepsy and that this gene may be associated with fear recognition in individuals with Turner syndrome.

A mutation in EFHC2 which results in a serine to a tyrosine substitution at amino acid position 430 (S430Y) has been associated with juvenile myoclonic epilepsy in a  male, German population. Additionally, a single nucleotide polymorphism in EFHC2 correlates to a reduced ability of Turner syndrome patients to recognize fear in facial expressions; however, these findings remain controversial.

Conservation in other species

References